Krider is an unincorporated community in Gage County, Nebraska, United States.

History
Krider was a station on the Chicago, Burlington and Quincy Railroad.

References

Unincorporated communities in Gage County, Nebraska
Unincorporated communities in Nebraska